Imtiaz Ahmad Lali is a Pakistani politician who was a Member of the Provincial Assembly of the Punjab, from May 2013 to May 2018.

Early life and education
He was born on 1 November 1957 in Chiniot.

He graduated from Forman Christian College in 1977 and has a degree of Bachelor of Arts.

Political career
He was elected to the Provincial assembly of the Punjab as an independent candidate in 1997 and again in 2002 from constituency[jhang-|||]
He was elected to the Provincial Assembly of the Punjab as a candidate of Pakistan Muslim League (Nawaz) from Constituency PP-75 (Jhang-III) in 2013 Pakistani general election.

References

Living people
Punjab MPAs 2013–2018
1957 births
Pakistan Muslim League (N) politicians
People from Chiniot District